Manku Thimma is a 1980 Indian Kannada-language film, directed by H. R. Bhargava and produced by Dwarakish. The film stars Dwarakish, Manjula, Srinath, Padmapriya and Hema Chowdhary. The film has musical score by Rajan–Nagendra. It is a remake of the 1969 Telugu film Sattekalapu Satteya which was also remade in Hindi in 1970 as Mastana starring Mehmood and in Tamil in 1970 as Patham Pasali starring Nagesh.

Cast 

Dwarakish
Manjula
Srinath
Padmapriya
Hema Choudhary
Manu
Baby Lakshmi
Thoogudeepa Srinivas
Sudheer
Arikesari
Chethan Ramarao
Shivaprakash
Sharapanjara Iyengar
Uma Shivakumar
B. Jayashree
Papamma
Srigowri
Kokila
Prabhakar Reddy in guest appearance
Chanda in guest appearance

Soundtrack 
The music was composed by Rajan–Nagendra.

References

External links 
 
 

1980 films
1980s Kannada-language films
Films scored by Rajan–Nagendra
Kannada remakes of Telugu films
Films directed by H. R. Bhargava